The Big House is an American prime time television sitcom starring actor/comedian Kevin Hart.  It ran on the ABC television network in April 2004, lasting for only six episodes.

The series represents a mirror-opposite of the NBC sitcom The Fresh Prince of Bel-Air.  Kevin Hart is a wealthy, pampered student from Malibu. After his father is arrested and imprisoned for embezzlement, Kevin moves to Philadelphia to live with his working-class aunt, uncle and cousins (the Cleveland family), and enrolls in Drexel University.

Cast 
 Kevin Hart as Himself
 Faizon Love as Warren Cleveland
 Arnetia Walker as Tina Cleveland
 Yvette Nicole Brown as Eartha Cleveland
 Aaron Grady as C.J. Cleveland
 Keith David as Clarence Cleveland

Episodes

Home media
Olive Films, under license from 20th Century Fox Home Entertainment, released the entire series on DVD in Region 1 on January 13, 2015.

In 2022, the series was made available for streaming online on Fox Corporation's Tubi.

References

External links 
 

2000s American black sitcoms
2004 American television series debuts
2004 American television series endings
American Broadcasting Company original programming
English-language television shows
Television series about families
Television series by 20th Century Fox Television
Television shows set in Philadelphia
TGIF (TV programming block)
Television series by Imagine Entertainment